Ängelholm–Helsingborg Airport  is an airport in Sweden, located about 34 km from Helsingborg and 7 km from Ängelholm. On 28 May 2020 the airport owner stated the airport would close by the end of 2020 unless government support was available.

History
A military airforce base was opened here in 1945. In 1960 civilian passenger flights started from this airport. In 2002 the airforce left the airport, and it became a civilian only airport. The route to Stockholm has always had the largest number of passengers.

Airlines and destinations 

The following airlines operate regular scheduled flights to and from Ängelholm–Helsingborg Airport:

Statistics
Ängelholm–Helsingborg Airport is southern Sweden's (Skåne) second largest airport and the 10th largest airport in the whole country. The airport had 403,313 passengers in 2018.

See also
 Linjeflyg flight 277
 List of the largest airports in the Nordic countries

References

External links
Ängelholm–Helsingborg Airport (Official website)

Airports in Skåne County
Ängelholm
Transport in Helsingborg
Airports in the Øresund Region